Canoe Lake is a small endorheic lake near the community of Weslemkoon in Addington Highlands in the north and on the western edge of Lennox and Addington County, Ontario, Canada. It is just south-east of the West Bay of Weslemkoon Lake.

See also
List of lakes in Ontario

References

 

Lakes of Lennox and Addington County